An election to Galway City Council took place on 27 June 1991 as part of that year's Irish local elections. 15 councillors were elected from three electoral divisions by PR-STV voting for a five-year term of office.

Results by party

Results by Electoral Area

Galway No.1

Galway No.2

Galway No.3

1991 Irish local elections
1991